Sapindales  is an order of flowering plants. Well-known members of Sapindales include citrus; maples, horse-chestnuts, lychees and rambutans; mangos and cashews; frankincense and myrrh; mahogany and neem.

The APG III system of 2009 includes it in the clade malvids (in rosids, in eudicots) with the following nine families:

Anacardiaceae
Biebersteiniaceae
Burseraceae
Kirkiaceae
Meliaceae
Nitrariaceae (including Peganaceae and Tetradiclidaceae)
Rutaceae
Sapindaceae
Simaroubaceae

The APG II system of 2003 allowed the optional segregation of families now included in the Nitrariaceae.

In the classification system of Dahlgren the Rutaceae were placed in the order Rutales, in the superorder Rutiflorae (also called Rutanae). The Cronquist system of 1981 used a somewhat different circumscription, including the following families:
Staphyleaceae
Melianthaceae
Bretschneideraceae
Akaniaceae
Sapindaceae
Hippocastanaceae
Aceraceae
Burseraceae
Anacardiaceae
Julianiaceae
Simaroubaceae
Cneoraceae
Meliaceae
Rutaceae
Zygophyllaceae
The difference from the APG III system is not as large as may appear, as the plants in the families Aceraceae and Hippocastanaceae stay in this order at APG III (both included in family Sapindaceae). The species now composing the family Nitrariaceae in APG III also belonged to this order in the Cronquist system as part of the family Zygophyllaceae, while those now in the family Kirkiaceae were present as part of the family Simaroubaceae.

References

Bibliography 

 

 
Angiosperm orders